Vulnerable is the ninth studio album by American singer Kenny Lattimore. It was released by Sincere Soul Records and Liger Enterprises on October 13, 2017. The album peaked at number 21 on the US Independent Albums chart.

Critical reception
Justin Kantor from SoulTracks found that Vulnerable "flows fluidly with ten thoughtfully crafted songs that complement the singer’s graceful tenor tenacity with smart production values. His phrasing and nuances shines through, but the arrangements stand equally firm in their musicality.  The set’s lead single, “Push” is, in fact, the only selection that bends considerably to current trends—and it does so in a way that doesn’t compromise melodic or lyrical quality."

Track listing

Notes
  denotes a co-producer

Charts

References 

2017 albums
Kenny Lattimore albums